Chah Mejeng (also Romanized as Chāh Mejeng; also known as Chāh Majīn and Chāh Mechang) is a village in Doruneh Rural District, Anabad District, Bardaskan County, Razavi Khorasan Province, Iran. At the 2006 census, its population was 128, in 32 families.

References 

Populated places in Bardaskan County